Ottawa West was a federal and provincial electoral district in Ontario, Canada, that was represented in the House of Commons of Canada from 1935 to 1997 and in the Legislative Assembly of Ontario from 1908 to 1926 and from 1955 to 1999.  It covered the western part of the Ottawa area.

Federal electoral district

The federal district was created from Ottawa and part of Carleton in 1934. The federal riding initially consisted of, in the city of Ottawa, the Central, Capital, Wellington, Dalhousie, the parts of Victoria and Elmdale wards east of Parkdale Avenue, and the part of Riverdale ward not included in Ottawa East.

In 1947, it was redefined to consist of, in the city of Ottawa, Central and Wellington wards, the part of Dalhousie Ward north of Carling Avenue, the part of Capital Ward north of Carling Avenue and Linden Terrace, and the parts of Victoria and Elmdale Wards east of Parkdale Avenue.

In 1952, it was redefined to consist of the part of the city of Ottawa west of a line running along Parkdale Avenue south to Avenue, east to O'Connor Street, north to Linden Terrace, and east to the Rideau Canal.

In 1966, it was redefined to consist of the part of the city of Ottawa west of a line running along the Canadian Pacific Railway line from the interprovincial boundary to Bayview Road, southeast to Bayswater Avenue, south to Carling Avenue, west to Fisher Avenue, south to Baseline Road, west to the western limit of the City of Ottawa.

In 1976, it was redefined to consist of the part of the city of Ottawa west of a line running along the Canadian Pacific Railway line from the interprovincial boundary, south to Somerset Street, west along Somerset Street and Wellington Street to Holland Avenue, south to Carling Avenue, west to Fisher Avenue, and south to the city limit.

In 1987, it was redefined to consist of the part of the city of Ottawa west of a line running from the eastern extremity of the southern limit of the City of Ottawa (immediately south of Baseline Road), east to Fisher Avenue, north to Carling Avenue, east to Island Park Drive, and north to the interprovincial boundary.

The federal electoral district was abolished in 1996 when it was redistributed between Ottawa Centre and Ottawa West—Nepean ridings.

Members of Parliament

This riding elected the following members of the House of Commons of Canada:

Members of Provincial Parliament

This riding elected the following members of the Legislative Assembly of Ontario:

Federal electoral history

|- 
  
|Liberal
|T. Franklin Ahearn
|align="right"|21,503   
  
|Conservative
|Hamnett Pinhey Hill
|align="right"| 15,219    
  
|Reconstruction
|Franklin Deans Burkholder
|align="right"| 7,274   
  
|Independent Liberal
|William Joseph Press
|align="right"|210    

|- 
  
|Liberal
|George McIlraith
|align="right"|  27,460   
  
|National Government
|Theodore Howell Leggett
|align="right"| 19,780    

|- 
  
|Liberal
|George McIlraith
|align="right"|24,458   
  
|Progressive Conservative
|Norman B. MacRostie
|align="right"| 21,993    
 
|Co-operative Commonwealth
|Walter B. Mann
|align="right"| 4,824   
  
|Labor–Progressive
|Harry Binder 
|align="right"| 602    
  
|Social Credit
|Kenneth L. McCuaig 
|align="right"|  495   
  
|Independent
|Sydney Tom Checkland
|align="right"|  177 

|- 
  
|Liberal
|George McIlraith
|align="right"| 24,295   
  
|Progressive Conservative
|Osmond Francis Howe
|align="right"| 15,010    
 
|Co-operative Commonwealth
|Walter Beresford Mann
|align="right"| 2,754   

|- 
  
|Liberal
|George McIlraith
|align="right"| 20,933   
  
|Progressive Conservative
|O. F. Howe 
|align="right"| 13,539    
 
|Co-operative Commonwealth
|John E. MacNab
|align="right"|  1,209   
  
|Labor–Progressive
|Daniel Nerenberg
|align="right"| 219   

|- 
  
|Liberal
|George McIlraith
|align="right"|19,434   
  
|Progressive Conservative
|Ethel T. Shaw
|align="right"| 12,538    
 
|Co-operative Commonwealth
|David Williams
|align="right"|  1,062   
  
|Social Credit
|Laurence M. Maloney
|align="right"| 881   

|- 
  
|Liberal
|George McIlraith
|align="right"|19,098   
  
|Progressive Conservative
|Charlotte Whitton 
|align="right"| 17,673    
 
|Co-operative Commonwealth
|James A. M. Allen
|align="right"| 751   

|- 
  
|Liberal
|George McIlraith
|align="right"| 16,935   
  
|Progressive Conservative
|Pat Kelly
|align="right"|  11,397    
 
|New Democratic
|Walter Mann 
|align="right"| 1,538   
  
|Social Credit
|F. D. Richardson
|align="right"|  698   

|- 
  
|Liberal
|George McIlraith
|align="right"| 18,634   
  
|Progressive Conservative
|Don Hueston
|align="right"|  9,852    
 
|New Democratic
|Brian E. Huggins
|align="right"| 1,422   
  
|Social Credit
|F. D. Richardson 
|align="right"| 924   

|- 
  
|Liberal
|George McIlraith
|align="right"| 14,945   
  
|Progressive Conservative
|Courtenay Evans
|align="right"| 8,604    
 
|New Democratic
|David John Weston
|align="right"|2,057   
  
|Social Credit
|Angelo Tomasini
|align="right"|504   

|- 
  
|Liberal
|Lloyd Francis
|align="right"|  23,750   || 52.61
  
|Progressive Conservative
|Richard A. Bell
|align="right"|16,392    || 36.31
 
|New Democratic
|Ralph Sutherland
|align="right"| 5,003   || 11.08

|- 
  
|Progressive Conservative
|Peter Reilly 
|align="right"| 22,169    
  
|Liberal
|Lloyd Francis
|align="right"| 18,423   
 
|New Democratic
|Pauline Jewett 
|align="right"| 13,498   
  
|Social Credit
|Priscilla Hamelin
|align="right"| 245   

|- 
  
|Liberal
|Lloyd Francis 
|align="right"| 23,604   
  
|Progressive Conservative
|Peter Reilly
|align="right"| 21,838    
 
|New Democratic
|Doris Shackleton
|align="right"|  6,480   
  
|No affiliation
|Lawrence F. Sullivan
|align="right"| 432    
  
|Social Credit
|Jacques Lapointe
|align="right"|192   
  
|Communist
|Jean Greatbatch 
|align="right"| 78    
  
|Marxist–Leninist
|Richard Bowen
|align="right"|  67    

|-
  
|Progressive Conservative
|Kenneth Binks  
|align="right"|24,981    
  
|Liberal
|Lloyd Francis
|align="right"| 22,985   
 
|New Democratic
|Abby Pollonetsky
|align="right"| 7,051 
  
|Independent
|John Turmel
|align="right"| 193    

|- 
  
|Liberal
|Lloyd Francis
|align="right"| 22,460   
  
|Progressive Conservative
|Kenneth Binks  
|align="right"| 21,940    
 
|New Democratic
|Abby Pollonetsky 
|align="right"| 5,955   
  
|Independent
|John A. Clark
|align="right"| 398    

|- 
  
|Progressive Conservative
|David Daubney
|align="right"|26,591    
  
|Liberal
|Lloyd Francis
|align="right"| 19,314   
 
|New Democratic
|Ross Chapman
|align="right"| 8,304   
  
|Independent
|Thérèse Turmel
|align="right"|285    

|- 
  
|Liberal
|Marlene Catterall
|align="right"|23,470   
  
|Progressive Conservative
|David Daubney
|align="right"| 18,299    
 
|New Democratic
|Theresa Kavanagh  
|align="right"| 5,300   
  
|Communist
|Peter Cavers
|align="right"|156    
  
|No affiliation
|Donna Petersen
|align="right"| 130    

|- 
  
|Liberal
|Marlene Catterall
|align="right"|28,012   
  
|Reform
|Peter Boddy 
|align="right"| 6,144    
  
|Progressive Conservative
|Nancy Munro-Parry
|align="right"| 6,135    
 
|New Democratic
|Norman Bobbitt
|align="right"| 1,854   
  
|National
|Bryce Wilson 
|align="right"| 832   

  
|Natural Law
|Stan Lamothe
|align="right"| 156    
  
|Libertarian
|Leonard Knoll
|align="right"| 122    
  
|Abolitionist
|Julie Start
|align="right"| 27  
  
|Commonwealth of Canada
|Kamal Shah
|align="right"|22

Partial provincial electoral history

External links
Federal riding history from the Library of Parliament

Electoral districts of Ottawa